Clamart is a commune in the southwestern suburbs of Paris, France.

The town is divided into two parts, separated by a forest: bas Clamart, the historical centre, and petit Clamart with urbanization developed in the 1960s replacing pea fields. The canton of Clamart includes only a part of the commune. The other part of the commune belongs to the canton of Le Plessis-Robinson.

Geography

Nearest places 
 Fontenay-aux-Roses
 Issy-les-Moulineaux
 Vanves
 Meudon
 Le Plessis-Robinson
 Sèvres

History

Les petits pois (peas) 
The city name is famous in French gastronomy. A speciality with peas as a side-dish, is called "à la Clamart". Close to Paris and its central marketplace (Les Halles), Clamart's peas were the first of the season.

De Gaulle assassination attempt 
On 22 August 1962 the French President Charles de Gaulle was the target of an assassination attempt organised by the French Air Force Lieutenant-Colonel Jean Bastien-Thiry. As de Gaulle's black Citroën DS 19 sped through Petit-Clamart it was met by a barrage of submachine-gun fire. De Gaulle and his entourage, which included his wife, survived the attempt without any casualties or serious injuries while the attempt's perpetrators were subsequently all arrested and put on trial. The leader of the assassination attempt, Jean Bastien-Thiry, was executed by firing squad after his 1963 conviction, and was the last person to be executed by firing squad in France.

Population

Transport 
Clamart is served by Clamart station on the Transilien Paris – Montparnasse suburban rail line. There are also several bus lines connecting Clamart to neighbouring towns.

Education 
Clamart has multiple primary schools, and attendance is determined by one's residence.

Middle schools:
 Collège Alain Founier
 Collège Maison Blanche

High school: Clamart has one single high school, located near the haut de Clamart': the Lycée Jacques Monod

Personalities 
Henri Matisse lived in Clamart before the First World War.
Roger Cotte (1921–1999), recorder player and musicologist, was born in Clamart.
Jean Arp and Sophie Taeuber-Arp lived in Clamart in the 1930s.
 Yasser Arafat died in the Hôpital d'instruction des armées Percy in 2004.
 Jean Bastien-Thiry, leader of 1962 assassination attempt against Charles de Gaulle.
 Nikolai Berdyaev died here in 1948.
 Hatem Ben Arfa was born here in 1987.
 Julien Kapek, athlete.
 Theofan (Bystrov), archbishop and theologian of Eastern Orthodox Church, lived here in 1931.
 Beauford Delaney, an American born artist, moved to the town in 1953.
 Vincent Poirier, professional basketball player for Real Madrid of the Liga ACB, was born here in 1993.
 Céline Boutier, professional golfer on LPGA Tour and Ladies European Tour, was born here in 1993.
 Alexander Blonz, Norwegian handball player was born here in 2000, and lived here the first year of his life.

International relations 

Clamart is twinned with:
 Lüneburg, Germany since 1975
 Scunthorpe, United Kingdom, since 1976
 Majadahonda, Spain, since 1988
 Artashat, Armenia, since 2003
 Penamacor, Portugal, since 2006

See also 

Communes of the Hauts-de-Seine department
 The statue La Source in Clamart is by Pierre Charles Lenoir

References

External links 

  
 New residents' welcome website  

 
Communes of Hauts-de-Seine
Hauts-de-Seine communes articles needing translation from French Wikipedia
New Classical architecture
New Urbanism communities